The Aline Covered Bridge, also known as Meiserville Covered Bridge, is a historic covered bridge located in Perry Township near Meiserville in Snyder County, Pennsylvania. It is a  Burr Truss bridge built in 1884.  It crosses the North Branch of Mahantango Creek.

In 1982 a new bridge was built to bypass the covered bridge, which is open only to pedestrian traffic.  A round picnic table sits in the middle of the bridge. 
It was listed on the National Register of Historic Places in 1979.

See also 
 National Register of Historic Places listings in Snyder County, Pennsylvania

References 

Bridges in Snyder County, Pennsylvania
Tourist attractions in Snyder County, Pennsylvania
Covered bridges on the National Register of Historic Places in Pennsylvania
Covered bridges in Snyder County, Pennsylvania
Bridges completed in 1884
Wooden bridges in Pennsylvania
1884 establishments in Pennsylvania
National Register of Historic Places in Snyder County, Pennsylvania
Road bridges on the National Register of Historic Places in Pennsylvania
Burr Truss bridges in the United States